The First Presbyterian Church is a historic church on AR 79B in Fordyce, Arkansas.  The congregation was organized in 1883, and was the first in the city of Fordyce.  This building is its third sanctuary, built in 1912 to a design by Tennessee architect Reuben Harrison Hunt.  It is a modest example of Gothic Revival styling executed in buff brick, with three towers.

The building was listed on the National Register of Historic Places in 1983.

See also
National Register of Historic Places listings in Dallas County, Arkansas

References

Presbyterian churches in Arkansas
Churches on the National Register of Historic Places in Arkansas
Gothic Revival church buildings in Arkansas
Churches completed in 1912
Churches in Dallas County, Arkansas
Buildings and structures in Fordyce, Arkansas
1883 establishments in Arkansas
National Register of Historic Places in Dallas County, Arkansas